Leptolalax pluvialis (sometimes referred to as rainy toad) is a frog species in the family Megophryidae. It is only known from its type locality, Fansipan mountain range in northern Vietnam, although it is expected to be found also in adjacent Yunnan, China. Its natural habitats are subtropical moist montane forests and rivers. Its status is insufficiently known.

Description
Leptolalax pluvialis is a small-sized Leptolalax: males measure  in snout-vent length. Its back is greyish brown with dark pattern with few black spots on its sides. It has dark golden irises.

References

pluvialis
Amphibians of Vietnam
Endemic fauna of Vietnam
Amphibians described in 2000
Taxonomy articles created by Polbot
Taxobox binomials not recognized by IUCN